Mychonoa is a genus of moths of the family Yponomeutidae.

Species
Mychonoa mesozona - Meyrick, 1892 

Yponomeutidae